Predrag Keros, MD, PhD (17 September 1933 – 23 February 2018) was a Croatian doctor and professor, known for developing the Keros classification technique.

Biography

He was born in Zagreb. He earned his MD (1958) and PhD (1962) from the School of Medicine, University of Zagreb. 

He became a professor, teaching in the medical and dental schools as well as well as other institutions, and held several leadership positions at the university and in professional organizations.  In addition to his teaching duties, he also served as editor in chief of the journals Libri oncologici and Acta Facultatis Medicae Zagrebiensis.

Keros is known for his method of classifying the depth of the olfactory fossa, which is called Keros classification.

Awards

 City of Zagreb General Assembly Award – the Memorial Medal (1970)
 Diploma of Medical News, from the Croatian Medical Association (1977)
 Boris Janković Argus Award (1981)
 University of Osijek Award (1985) 
 State Award for Science (Zagreb)
 City of Zagreb Prize for Science (1989)
 Josip Juraj Strossmayer Award (2006)
 Honorary Member of the Croatian Medical Association (2011)
 State Prize for the Promotion of Science – Lifetime Achievement (2011).

References

External links
 Keros classification - Youtube demo
 Keros classification - radiopaedia
 CROSBI - Croatian scientific bibliography - Publications by Predrag Keros list

1933 births
2018 deaths
Physicians from Zagreb
Academic staff of the University of Zagreb

University of Zagreb alumni